Katharine Culbert Lyall (born April 26, 1941) was the president of the University of Wisconsin System from 1992 to 2004. Lyall was the first woman president in the UW system. She had previously served as Executive Vice President of the System, and Director of the Graduate Program in Public Policy at Johns Hopkins University.  She was born in Lancaster, Pennsylvania. She received a B.A. (1963) and a Ph.D. (1969) in economics from Cornell University, and an MBA (1965) from New York University.

References

1941 births
Living people
People from Lancaster, Pennsylvania
Cornell University alumni
New York University Stern School of Business alumni
University of Wisconsin–Madison faculty
Presidents of the University of Wisconsin System